Casbah Club is a British mod rock band formed in Finchley, London in 2004.

Career 

The band consisted of guitarist/vocalist Simon Townshend (brother of Pete Townshend and touring member of The Who), bassist Bruce Foxton (The Jam, Stiff Little Fingers), drummer Mark Brzezicki (Procol Harum, Big Country), and rhythm guitarist Bruce Watson (Big Country). Scottish singer JJ Gilmour sang with the band in its earliest incarnation; a live album entitled Eastworld from this period was released.

Watson left the band to concentrate on his work with Four Good Men prior to re-forming Big Country with Brzezicki and Tony Butler for a 25th anniversary tour in 2007.

Casbah Club's debut album, Venustraphobia, was released in June 2006. During that year they toured with The Who, wherein Simon Townshend played a support set as a member of Casbah Club before playing the headlining set as a member of The Who.

As of September 2008, Casbah Club has been on hiatus as Townshend continues to tour with The Who and Bruce Foxton tours with The Jam. Bruce Watson and Mark Brzezizki currently record and tour with the reformed Big Country.

Band members

Current members 
Simon Townshend – lead vocals, lead guitar, keyboards (2006–2008, 2020–present)
Phil Palmer – rhythm guitar, backing vocals (2020–present)
Paul Turner – bass (2020–present)
Zak Starkey – drums (2020–present)

Past members 
Bruce Foxton – bass (2004–2008)
Bruce Watson – rhythm guitar, backing vocals (2004–2008)
Mark Brzezicki – drums, Percussion (2004–2008)
JJ Gilmour – lead vocals (2004–2006)

Discography 
Eastworld (2004)
Venustraphobia (2006)

External links 
Official website

English rock music groups
British supergroups
Musical groups established in 2004
Musical groups disestablished in 2008
Musical groups reestablished in 2020
Rock music supergroups